Elizabeth Lyon may refer to:

 Elizabeth Lyon, prostitute, lover of English thief, Jack Sheppard
Elizabeth Lyon, Countess of Strathmore

See also
Elizabeth Bowes-Lyon, wife of George VI of Great Britain and mother of Elizabeth II